Google Pixel is a brand of portable consumer electronic devices developed by Google that run either ChromeOS or the Android operating system. The main line of Pixel products consist of Android-powered smartphones, which have been produced since October 2016 as the replacement of the older Nexus, and of which the Pixel 7 is the current model. The Pixel brand also includes laptop and tablet computers, as well as several accessories, and was originally introduced in February 2013 with the Chromebook Pixel.

Phones

Pixel and Pixel XL 

Google announced the first generation Pixel smartphones, the Pixel and the Pixel XL, on October 4, 2016 during the #MadeByGoogle event. Google emphasized the camera on the two phones, which ranked as the best smartphone camera on DxOMarkMobile with 90 points until HTC released the U11, which also scored 90 points. This is largely due to software optimizations such as HDR+. The Pixel phones also include unlimited cloud storage for pictures on Google Photos and, for devices purchased directly from Google, an unlockable bootloader. In 2019, a class action lawsuit over faulty microphones in some devices enabled Pixel owners to claim up to $500 in compensation.

 Display: 5.0" 60 Hz AMOLED display with 1080×1920 pixel resolution (Pixel); 5.5" AMOLED 60 Hz display with 1440×2560 pixel resolution (Pixel XL)
 Processor: Qualcomm Snapdragon 821
 Storage: UFS 2.0 with 32 GB or 128 GB
 RAM: 4 GB LPDDR4
 Cameras: 12.3 MP rear camera Sony Exmore IMX378 sensor with f/2.0 lens and IR laser-assisted autofocus; 1.55 μm pixel size. 8 MP front camera with f/2.4 lens
 Battery: 2,770 mAh (Pixel); 3,450 mAh (Pixel XL); both are non-removable and have fast charging
 Materials: Aluminum unibody design with hybrid coating; IP53 water and dust resistance
 Colors: Very Silver, Quite Black or Really Blue (Limited Edition)
 Operating system: Android 7.1 Nougat; upgradable to Android 10

Pixel 2 and 2 XL 

Google announced the Pixel 2 series, consisting of the Pixel 2 and Pixel 2 XL, on October 4, 2017.

 Display: 5.0" AMOLED 60Hz display with 1080×1920 pixel resolution (Pixel 2); 6" P-OLED 60Hz display with 1440×2880 pixel resolution (Pixel 2 XL); Both displays have Corning Gorilla Glass 5
 Processor: Qualcomm Snapdragon 835
 Storage: UFS 2.1 with 64 GB or 128 GB
 RAM: 4 GB LPDDR4X
 Cameras: 12.2 MP rear camera Sony Exmor IMX362 with f/1.8 lens, IR laser-assisted autofocus, optical and electronic image stabilization; 8 MP front camera with f/2.4 lens
 Battery: 2,700 mAh (Pixel 2); 3,520 mAh (Pixel 2 XL); both are non-removable and have fast charging
 Materials: Aluminum unibody design with hybrid coating; IP67 water and dust resistance
 Colors: Just Black, Clearly White or Kinda Blue (Pixel 2); Just Black or Black and White (Pixel 2 XL)
 Operating system: Android 8.0 Oreo; upgradable to Android 11

Pixel 3 and 3 XL 

Google announced the Pixel 3 and Pixel 3 XL at an event on October 9, 2018, alongside several other products.

 Display: Pixel 3 5.5" OLED, 60Hz, 2160×1080 (18:9> pixel resolution; Pixel 3 XL 6.3" OLED, 60Hz, 2960×1440 (18.5:9) pixel resolution; both displays have Corning Gorilla Glass 5.
 Processor: Qualcomm Snapdragon 845
 Storage: UFS 2.1 with 64 GB or 128 GB
 RAM: 4 GB LPDDR4X
 Cameras: 12.2 MP rear camera Sony Exmor IMX363 with f/1.8 lens, IR laser-assisted autofocus, optical and electronic image stabilization; 8 MP front camera with f/1.8 lens and 75° lens, second front camera with 8 MP, f/2.2, fixed focus and 97° lens; stereo audio added to video recording
 Battery: 2,915 mAh (Pixel 3); 3,430 mAh (Pixel 3 XL); both are non-removable and have fast charging and wireless charging
 Materials: Aluminum frame, matte glass back, IP68 water and dust resistance
 Colors: Just Black, Clearly White, and Not Pink
 Operating system: Android 9; upgradable to Android 12

Pixel 3a and 3a XL 

On May 7, at I/O 2019, Google announced the Pixel 3a and Pixel 3a XL, budget alternatives to the original two Pixel 3 devices.

 Display: Pixel 3a 5.6" OLED, 60 Hz, 2220×1080 (18.5:9) pixel resolution; Pixel 3a XL 6" OLED, 60 Hz, 2160x1080 (18:9) pixel resolution; both displays have Asahi Dragontrail Glass
 Processor: Qualcomm Snapdragon 670
 Storage: 64 GB
 RAM: 4 GB LPDDR4X
 Cameras: 12.2 MP rear camera with f/1.8 lens, IR laser-assisted autofocus, optical and electronic image stabilization; 8 MP front camera with f/2.0 lens and 84° lens
 Battery: 3,000 mAh (Pixel 3a); 3700 mAh (Pixel 3a XL); both are non-removable and have fast charging, but no wireless charging
 Materials: Polycarbonate body
 Colors: Just Black, Clearly White, Purple-ish
 Operating system: Android 9, upgradable to Android 12

Pixel 4 and 4 XL 

Google announced the Pixel 4 and Pixel 4 XL at an event on October 15, 2019, alongside several other products.

 Display: Pixel 4 5.7" OLED, 90 Hz, 2280×1080 (19:9) pixel resolution; Pixel 4 XL 6.3" OLED, 90 Hz, 3040×1440 (19:9) pixel resolution; both displays have Corning Gorilla Glass 5.
 Processor: Qualcomm Snapdragon 855
 Storage: 64 GB or 128 GB
 RAM: 6 GB LPDDR4X
 Cameras: 12.2 MP sensor with f/1.8 lens and 16 MP telephoto sensor with f/2.4 lens, IR laser-assisted autofocus, optical and electronic image stabilization; 8 MP front camera with f/2.0 lens and 90° lens
 Battery: 2,800 mAh (Pixel 4); 3,700 mAh (Pixel 4 XL); both are non-removable and have fast charging and wireless charging
 Materials: Aluminum frame, matte or glossy glass back, IP68 water and dust resistance
 Colors: Just Black, Clearly White, and Oh So Orange
 Operating system: Android 10, upgradable to Android 13

In 2019, Google offered a bug bounty of up to $1.5 million for the Titan M security chip built into Pixel 3, Pixel 3a and Pixel 4.

Pixel 4a and 4a (5G) 

Google announced the Pixel 4a on August 3, 2020 and the Pixel 4a (5G) on September 30, 2020, as budget alternatives to the original two Pixel 4 devices.

 Display: 5.8" OLED (4a) 6.2" OLED (4a 5G), 60 Hz, 2340×1080 (19.5:9) pixel resolution; the display uses Corning Gorilla Glass 3. Both have a hole punch for the front camera.
 Processor: Qualcomm Snapdragon 730G (4a); Qualcomm Snapdragon 765G (4a 5G)
 Storage: 128 GB
 RAM: 6 GB LPDDR4X
 Camera: 12.2 MP dual-pixel sensor with f/1.7 lens, autofocus with dual-pixel phase detection, optical and electrical image stabilization. In addition, the 4a 5G has a 16 MP ultrawide sensor with f/2.2 lens. Both have an 8 MP front camera with f/2.0 lens.
 Battery: 3,140 mAh (4a); Typical - 3,885 mAh, Minimum - 3,800 mAh (4a 5G); both are non-removable and feature all day battery as well as fast charging
 Materials: Polycarbonate body 
 Colors: Just Black or Barely Blue (Limited Edition) (Pixel 4a); Just Black or Clearly White (Pixel 4a 5G)
 Operating System: Android 10, upgradable to Android 13 (4a); Android 11 (4a 5G), upgradable to Android 13

Pixel 5 

Google announced the Pixel 5 on September 30, 2020.

 Display: 6.0" OLED, 90 Hz, 2340×1080 (19.5:9) pixel resolution; the display uses Corning Gorilla Glass 6.
 Processor: Qualcomm Snapdragon 765G
 Storage: 128 GB
 RAM: 8 GB LPDDR4X
 Camera: 12.2 MP sensor with f/1.7 lens and 16 MP ultrawide sensor with f/2.2 lens, autofocus with dual-pixel phase detection, optical and electrical image stabilization; 8 MP front camera with f/2.0 lens.
 Battery: 4,080 mAh; it is non-removable and features fast charging and wireless charging, all day battery, and Battery Share.
 Materials: Brushed aluminum body, IP68 water and dust resistance
 Colors: Just Black and Sorta Sage
 Operating System: Android 11, upgradable to Android 13

Pixel 5a 

Google announced the Pixel 5a on August 17, 2021.

 Display: 6.34" OLED, 60 Hz, 2400×1080 (20:9) pixel resolution; the display uses Corning Gorilla Glass 3. It has a hole punch for the front camera.
 Processor: Qualcomm Snapdragon 765G
 Storage: 128 GB
 RAM: 6 GB LPDDR4X
 Camera: 12.2 MP sensor with f/1.7 lens and 16 MP ultrawide sensor with f/2.2 lens, autofocus with dual-pixel phase detection, optical and electrical image stabilization; 8 MP front camera with f/2.0 lens.
 Battery: 4,680 mAh; non-removable and features all day battery as well as fast charging
 Materials: Brushed aluminum body, IP67 water and dust resistance
 Colors: Mostly Black
 Operating System: Android 11, upgradable to Android 13

Pixel 6 and 6 Pro 

Google announced the Pixel 6 and Pixel 6 Pro on October 19, 2021.

 Display: Pixel 6 6.4" OLED, 90 Hz, 2400×1080 FHD+ pixel resolution; Pixel 6 Pro 6.7" LTPO OLED, 120 Hz, 3120×1440 QHD+ pixel resolution; both have Corning Gorilla Glass Victus.
 Processor: Google Tensor
 Storage: Pixel 6 128 or 256 GB; Pixel 6 Pro 128, 256, or 512 GB 
 RAM: 8 GB LPDDR5 (Pixel 6); 12 GB LPDDR5 (Pixel 6 Pro)
 Cameras: 
 Pixel 6: Rear 50 MP sensor with f/1.85 lens, laser detect autofocus, optical image stabilization; Rear 12 MP ultrawide sensor with f/2.2 lens; Front 8 MP sensor with f/2.0 lens and 84° field of view;
 Pixel 6 Pro: Rear 50 MP sensor with f/1.85 lens, laser detect autofocus, optical image stabilization; Rear 12 MP ultrawide sensor with f/2.2 lens; Rear 48 MP telephoto sensor with f/3.5 lens; Front 11.1 MP front camera with f/2.2 lens and 94° field of view.
 Battery: 4,614 mAh (Pixel 6); 5,003 mAh (Pixel 6 Pro); both are non-removable and have fast charging, wireless charging and reverse wireless charging
 Materials: Aluminum frame, glass back, IP68 water and dust resistance
 Colors: Pixel 6 Stormy Black, Kinda Coral and Sorta Seafoam; Pixel 6 Pro Stormy Black, Cloudy White and Sorta Sunny
 Operating system: Android 12, upgradable to Android 13, with minimum 3 years of major OS support and 5 years of security update support.

Pixel 6a 

Google announced the Pixel 6a on May 11, 2022.

 Display: 6.1" OLED, 60 Hz, 2400×1080 (20:9) pixel resolution; the display uses Corning Gorilla Glass 3. It has a hole punch for the front camera.
 Processor: Google Tensor
 Storage: 128 GB
 RAM: 6 GB LPDDR5
 Camera: 12.2 MP sensor with f/1.7 lens and 12 MP ultrawide sensor with f/2.2 lens, autofocus with dual-pixel phase detection, optical and electrical image stabilization; 8 MP front camera with f/2.0 lens.
 Battery: 4,410 mAh; non-removable battery with 18 W charging
 Materials: Aluminum frame, plastic back, IP67 water and dust resistance
 Colors: Charcoal, Chalk and Sage
 Operating System: Android 12, upgradable to Android 13, with minimum 3 years of major OS support and 5 years of security update support.

Pixel 7 and 7 Pro

Google announced the Pixel 7 and Pixel 7 Pro on October 6, 2022.

 Display: Pixel 7 6.3" OLED, 90 Hz, 2400×1080 FHD+ pixel resolution; Pixel 7 Pro 6.7" LTPO OLED, 120 Hz, 3120×1440 QHD+ pixel resolution; both have Corning Gorilla Glass Victus.
 Processor: Google Tensor G2
 Storage: Pixel 7 128 or 256 GB; Pixel 7 Pro 128, 256, or 512 GB 
 RAM: 8 GB LPDDR5 (Pixel 7); 12 GB LPDDR5 (Pixel 7 Pro)
 Cameras: Pixel 7 Rear 50 MP sensor with f/1.85 lens and 12 MP ultrawide sensor with f/2.2 lens, front 8 MP sensor with f/2.2 lens and 92.8° field of view; Pixel 7 Pro Rear 50 MP sensor with f/1.85 lens, 12 MP ultrawide sensor with f/2.2 lens and 48 MP telephoto sensor with f/3.5 lens, front 11.1 MP sensor with f/2.2 lens and 92.8° field of view; Laser detect autofocus, optical image stabilization.
 Battery: 4,355 mAh (Pixel 7); 5,000 mAh (Pixel 7 Pro); both are non-removable and have fast charging, wireless charging and reverse wireless charging
 Materials: Aluminum frame, glass back, IP68 water and dust resistance
 Colors: Pixel 7 Obsidian, Snow and Lemongrass; Pixel 7 Pro Obsidian, Snow and Hazel
 Operating system: Android 13, with minimum 3 years of major OS support and 5 years of security update support.

Tablets

Pixel C 

The Pixel C was announced by Google at an event on September 29, 2015, alongside the Nexus 5X and Nexus 6P phones (among other products). The Pixel C includes a USB-C port and a 3.5 mm headphone jack. The device shipped with Android 6.0.1 Marshmallow, and later received Android 7.x Nougat and Android 8.x Oreo. Google stopped selling the Pixel C in December 2017.

 Display: 10.2" display with 2560×1800 pixel resolution
 Processor: NVIDIA Tegra X1
 Storage: 32 or 64 GB
 RAM: 3 GB
 Cameras: 8 MP rear camera; 2 MP front camera
 Battery: 9,000 mAh (non-removable)

Pixel Slate 

The Pixel Slate, a  2-in-1 tablet and laptop, was announced by Google in New York City on October 9, 2018, alongside the Pixel 3 and 3 XL. The Pixel Slate includes two USB-C ports but omits the headphone jack. The device runs ChromeOS on Intel Kaby Lake processors, with options ranging from a Celeron on the low end to an i7 on the high end. In June 2019, Google announced it will not further develop the product line, and cancelled two models that were under development.

Pixel Tablet 
The Pixel Tablet was announced by Google at I/O 2022. It will have come with stand similar to that of a Home Hub, however it will be detachable. It is planned for release in 2023.

Laptops

Chromebook Pixel (2013) 

Google announced the first generation Chromebook Pixel in a blog post on February 21, 2013. The laptop includes an SD/multi-card reader, Mini DisplayPort, combination headphone/microphone jack, and two USB 2.0 ports. Some of the device's other features include a backlit keyboard, a "fully clickable etched glass touchpad," integrated stereo speakers, and two built-in microphones.

 Display: 12.85" display with 2560×1700 pixel resolution
 Processor: 3rd generation (Ivy Bridge) Intel Core i5 processor
 Storage: 32 GB internal storage and 1 TB Google Drive storage for 3 years
 RAM: 4 GB
 Battery: 59 Wh

Chromebook Pixel (2015) 

On March 11, 2015, Google announced the second generation of the Chromebook Pixel in a blog post. The laptop includes two USB-C ports, two USB 3.0 ports, an SD card slot, and a combination headphone/microphone jack. The device also has a backlit keyboard, a "multi-touch, clickable glass touchpad," built-in stereo speakers, and two built-in microphones, among other features.

Google discontinued the 2015 Chromebook Pixel on August 29, 2016.

 Display: 12.85" display with 2560×1700 pixel resolution
 Processor: 5th generation (Broadwell) Intel Core i5 or i7 processor
 Storage: 32 or 64 GB internal storage and 1 TB Google Drive storage for 3 years
 RAM: 8 or 16 GB
 Battery: 72 Wh

Pixelbook 

On October 4, 2017, Google launched the first generation of the Pixelbook at its Made by Google 2017 event.

 Display: 12.3" display with 2400×1600 pixel resolution (235 ppi)
 Processor: 7th generation (Kaby Lake) Intel Core i5 or i7 processor
 Storage: 128, 256, or 512 GB internal storage
 RAM: 8 or 16 GB

Pixelbook Go 

On October 15, 2019, Google announced a mid-range version of the Pixelbook, named the Pixelbook Go, at its Made by Google 2019 event.

 Display: 13.3" display with 1920×1080 pixel resolution (166 ppi) or "Molecular Display" 3840×2160 pixel resolution (331 ppi)
 Processor: 8th generation (Amber Lake) Intel Core m3, i5 or i7 processor
 Storage: 64, 128, or 256 GB internal storage
 RAM: 8 or 16 GB
 Battery: 47 Wh, 56 Wh (Molecular Display)

Smartwatches

Pixel Watch 
The Google Pixel Watch is a first-generation wearable made by Google. It features a circular display. Multiple wristbands for the watch are available on the Google Store for purchase.

Accessories

Pixel Buds 

At Google's October 2017 hardware event, a set of wireless earbuds were unveiled alongside the Pixel 2 smartphones. The earbuds are designed for phones running Android Marshmallow or higher, and work with Google Assistant. In addition to audio playback and answering calls, the earbuds support translation in 40 languages through Google Translate. The earbuds are able to auto pair with the Pixel 2 with the help of the Google Assistant and "Nearby". The Pixel Buds are available in the colors Just Black, Clearly White and Kinda Blue. The earbuds have a battery capacity of 120 mAh while the charging case that comes with the Pixel Buds have a battery capacity of 620 mAh. The earbuds are priced at $159.

Pixelbook Pen 
Alongside the launch of the Pixelbook in October 2017, Google announced the Pixelbook Pen, a stylus to be used with the Pixelbook. It has pressure sensitivity as well as support for Google Assistant. The Pen is powered by a replaceable AAAA battery and is priced at US$99.

Pixel Stand 
In October 2018, Google announced the Pixel Stand alongside the Pixel 3 smartphones. In addition to standard 5 watt Qi wireless charging, the Pixel Stand has wireless 10 watt charging using a proprietary technology from Google. It also enables a software mode on the Pixel 3 that allows it to act as a smart display similar to the Google Home Hub.

Software

Pixel UI (Pixel Launcher) 

Google Pixel UI is an Android skin used for the Google Pixel line of smartphone, and developed by Google. Starting from first generation of Google Pixel phones, Google had replaced the launcher for their smartphone with Pixel Launcher instead of Google Now Launcher which is the default launcher for Nexus series.

Unlike the Nexus phones, which Google shipped with "stock" Android (AOSP), the Pixel UI that came with the first generation Pixel phones were slightly modified compared to "stock" Android. Currently, Pixel UI and its home launcher are available on Pixel family devices only. (However, third-party modifications allow non-Pixel smartphones to install the Pixel Launcher with Google Now feed integration).

During the launch of Android 4.x "Ice Cream Sandwich", Google had started to replace some of the stock Android apps with Google apps, including the stock Android music apps with Google Play Music, and Android browser with Google Chrome. By the launch of Android 4.4.x "KitKat", most of the stock Android apps had been replaced with Google apps, such as the stock Android gallery being replaced with Google Photos, etc. This also includes the Android home launcher being replaced with the Google Now Launcher, allowing users to access to their Google Now feed more conveniently. However, the rest of the UI was still similar to stock Android, including the settings menu and toggles buttons colors.

Google officially launched the Pixel Launcher and Pixel UI together the Pixel phones; unlike the Google Now Launcher which allowed non Nexus phones to install, the Pixel Launcher was only available on the Pixel phones. Most Android smartphones including Nexus phones are not compatible with the launcher. Some of the modifications Google had done to differentiate Pixel UI with stock Android included the setting toggle's buttons colors, and 24/7 online support which allowed the user to get direct support from Google's customer support.

Launcher version list
 Pixel Launcher – "7.1.1" (based on Android 7.x "Nougat")
 Pixel Launcher – "8.1.0" (based on Android 8.x "Oreo")
 Pixel Launcher – "9.0" (based on Android 9 "Pie")
 Pixel Launcher – "10.0" (based on Android 10) 
 Pixel Launcher – "11.0" (based on Android 11)
 Pixel Launcher – "12.0" (based on Android 12)
 Pixel Launcher – "13.0" (based on Android 13)

See also 
 Android One
 Google Nexus
 Google Tensor
 List of Google Play edition devices
 List of Google products

References

External links 

 Google Store

 
Android (operating system)
Computer-related introductions in 2013
Pixel
Tablet computers